TeX Live is a cross-platform, free software distribution for the TeX typesetting system that includes major TeX-related programs, macro packages, and fonts.  It is the replacement of its no-longer supported counterpart teTeX.
It is now the default TeX distribution for several Linux distributions such as
openSUSE,
Fedora,
Debian, Ubuntu, 
Termux and Gentoo.
Other Unix operating systems like OpenBSD, FreeBSD and NetBSD have also converted from teTeX to TeX Live.

The project was originally started by Sebastian Rahtz in 1996 in collaboration with the TeX user groups worldwide, including the TeX Users Group. Today, it is maintained by Karl Berry, Akira Kakuto, Luigi Scarso and many other people.

Up to version 2009, TeX Live could be run directly, or "live", from a CD-ROM, from a DVD-ROM, or from any other mobile device, hence its name. As of TeX Live 2010, it was no longer possible to run the distribution from the TeX Collection DVD due to restrictions in storage space. TeX Live follows the TeX Directory Structure.

Since the 2009 release, the editor TeXworks is included for Microsoft Windows and Mac OS X, as well as the vector graphics language Asymptote.

For Mac OS X there is MacTeX which comprises the full TeX Live distribution as well as some additional tools for using TeX on the Mac, most notably the editor TeXShop and the bibliography manager BibDesk. Similar to Basic MikTeX in MikTeX, a substantially smaller download, BasicTeX, can also be used for Mac as well. TeX Live can also be compiled and installed through MacPorts and Homebrew.

Release history

See also

 MiKTeX

References

External links
 

Free TeX software
Linux TeX software
Software using the LPPL license
TeX software for macOS
TeX software for Windows